Hobby Field ,  is a public, non-towered airport located one mile (1.6 km) northeast of the city of Creswell in Lane County, Oregon, United States.

The field is approximately 9 miles (14 km) south of Eugene, Oregon.

Facilities
Hobby Field has tie downs for local and transient aircraft, along with self serve 100 LL fuel. There is a small terminal building found near transient parking.

External links
 

 

Airports in Lane County, Oregon
Creswell, Oregon